José Javier Zubillaga Martínez (born 12 August 1959 in Logroño, La Rioja) is a Spanish retired footballer who played as a midfielder.

Football career
Zubillaga's father, Cesáreo (a native of San Sebastián), was a professional footballer who played for CD Logroñés in the Segunda Liga. Javier began playing youth football with Logroño-based CD Berceo, before joining Real Sociedad.

During his ten-year professional career, Zubillaga played with Real Sociedad and RCD Español. He won the La Liga title in the 1981–82 season with the former team, although he only contributed with eight games (184 minutes, no complete matches). Until 1987, year in which he helped the Basques conquer the Copa del Rey, he never played in more than 18 league matches, and left precisely in that summer.

Zubillaga then spent four years in Catalonia, experiencing one promotion and relegation each in consecutive seasons. He finally retired in 1991 at nearly 32, taking up coaching in the following decade, always in Segunda División B – he also worked with several clubs in directorial capacities from 1994 onwards, including hometown's CD Logroñés.

Honours
Real Sociedad
La Liga: 1981–82
Copa del Rey: 1986–87
Supercopa de España: 1982

Español
UEFA Cup: Runner-up 1987–88

References

External links

Espanyol archives 

1959 births
Living people
Sportspeople from Logroño
Spanish footballers
Footballers from La Rioja (Spain)
Association football midfielders
La Liga players
Segunda División players
Real Sociedad footballers
RCD Espanyol footballers
Spain youth international footballers
Spanish football managers
Segunda División B managers
Real Unión managers
UE Lleida managers